The Xiaoli Feidao series is a series of five wuxia novels by Gu Long. First published between 1968 and 1981, the five novels have since been adapted into seven films and 18 television series .

Weapon 
The Little Li Flying Dagger is the weapon of Li Xunhuan, Ye Kai, Ding Lingzhong and Li Huai.

The blade of the dagger is three cun and seven fen long. It is forged from ordinary steel and iron, unlike other fictional weapons forged from special materials. It ranks third in the Book of Weapons.

Novels 
Duoqing Jianke Wuqing Jian (published in 1968)
Li Xunhuan, the protagonist of the first novel, becomes a famous figure in the jianghu (martial artists' community) for his skillful use of his signature weapon, the Little Li Flying Dagger. Although he is secretly in love with Lin Shiyin, he ultimately decides to give up on her in order to repay the kindness he had received from his sworn brother, Long Xiaoyun, who is also in love with Lin Shiyin. After Lin Shiyin and Long Xiaoyun are married, Li Xunhuan feels so emotionally hurt that he retires from the jianghu to lead a reclusive life. When Li Xunhuan comes out of retirement a decade later, he encounter a swordsman, Afei, and befriends him. He also meets a maiden, Sun Xiaohong, whom he eventually marries. Around the time, a mysterious "Plum Flower Bandit" has committed several robberies and rumours in the jianghu suggest that the bandit is Li Xunhuan. With Afei's help, Li Xunhuan manages to clear his name and expose the bandit's true identity. At the same time, Li Xunhuan is drawn into the complex feuds involving three key figures: his sworn brother Long Xiaoyun; Shangguan Jinhong, the evil chief of the Gold and Money Gang; and Shangguan Jinhong's lover, Lin Xian'er. Li Xunhuan ultimately defeats Shangguan Jinhong and restores peace in the jianghu before retiring once again to spend the rest of his life with Sun Xiaohong.

Biancheng Langzi (published in 1972)
Ye Kai, the protagonist of the second novel, is Li Xunhuan's apprentice who has inherited his master's weapon and skills. The novel begins with the murders of a notable martial artist and his family. Ye Kai and his best friend, Fu Hongxue, set out to investigate and solve the case. During their adventures, they meet their respective romantic interests: Ding Linglin and Cuinong.

Jiuyue Yingfei (published in 1973)
The protagonist of the third novel is Ye Kai, Li Xunhuan's apprentice. Ye Kai has been tasked to take care of Shangguan Xiaoxian, the daughter of Shangguan Jinhong and Lin Xian'er from the first novel. Although Shangguan Xiaoxian appears slow-witted, she is a key target of many jianghu figures seeking power because she has inherited her father's wealth and martial arts manuals. When Ye Kai plans to keep Shangguan Xiaoxian hidden in a secret location, the information is mysteriously leaked out. Suspecting that there is a spy among them, Ye Kai sets a trap to lure the spy out. It turns out that the spy is Shangguan Xiaoxian, who has been pretending to be slow-witted to put Ye Kai off guard. All this while, she has been manipulating him into helping her eliminate her potential rivals so that she can restore the Gold and Money Gang and become its new chief. The novel ends with Ye Kai defeating Shangguan Xiaoxian in a duel.

Tianya Mingyue Dao (published in 1974)
The protagonist of the fourth novel is a middle-aged Fu Hongxue, Ye Kai's best friend in the second novel. He suffers from epilepsy and an injured right leg, and still struggles to cope with the death of his lover, Cuinong, in the second novel. Gongzi Yu, a wealthy and powerful martial artist, bribes the swordsman Yan Nanfei to serve as his decoy and sends him to assassinate Fu Hongxue. Fu Hongxue defeats Yan Nanfei twice but spares his life. In the meantime, Gongzi Yu sends Zhuo Yuzhen to seduce Qiu Shuiqing, the owner of the Peacock Tassel, and become Qiu Shuiqing's mistress. Gongzi Yu later sends his followers to destroy and kill Qiu Shuiqing. Before his death, Qiu Shuiqing encounters Fu Hongxue and implores him to take care of Zhuo Yuzhen. Fu Hongxue learns the truth from Zhuo Yuzhen and goes to confront Gongzi Yu. He defeats and kills Yan Nanfei, who fights him on Gongzi Yu's behalf. When Gongzi Yu makes an offer to Fu Hongxue to replace Yan Nanfei and serve as his decoy, Fu Hongxue rejects the offer and retires from the jianghu.

Feidao, Youjian Feidao (published in 1981)
The protagonist of the fifth novel is Li Huai, Li Xunhuan's grandson. Li Huai is an illegitimate child since his father had a secret affair with Shangguan Jinhong's daughter (Shangguan Xiaoxian's younger sister). He inherits his grandfather's weapon and skills, as well as the Shangguan family's treasure left behind by his mother. While roaming the jianghu, he meets Xue Caiyue, whom he falls in love with. However, they turn out to be star-crossed lovers because Li Huai's father had killed Xue Caiyue's father in a duel many years ago. Xue Caiyue is forced to settle the family feud in a duel with Li Huai.

Adaptations

Films

Television series

References 

 
Book series introduced in 1968
Novels by Gu Long
Novel series